Chionodes whitmanella is a moth in the family Gelechiidae. It is found in North America, where it has been recorded from south-western Manitoba and eastern Washington to Colorado, Arizona and California.

References

Chionodes
Moths described in 1942
Moths of North America